Aliabad (also Romanized as ‘Alīābād) is a village in Qurigol Rural District, in the Central District of Bostanabad County, East Azerbaijan Province, Iran. At the 2006 census, its population was 1,250, in 342 families.

References 

Populated places in Bostanabad County